Winooski  is a city in Chittenden County, Vermont, United States. Located on the Winooski River, as of the 2020 U.S. census the municipal population was 7,997. The city is the most densely populated municipality in northern New England, an area comprising the states of Maine, New Hampshire, and Vermont. It is the smallest of Vermont's 10 cities by area, though the city of Vergennes has the smallest population. As part of the Burlington, Vermont metropolitan area, it is bordered by Burlington, Colchester, and South Burlington.

Geography
According to the United States Census Bureau, the city has a total area of 1.5 square miles (3.9 km2), of which  0.1 sq mi (0.2 km2) (5.30%) is covered by water.

Etymology

As early as 750 CE, the Abenaki tribe lived along the shores of a cascading waterfall in a fertile river valley they called Winoskitegw, meaning “land of the wild onion". Winooski's southern border is formed by the Winooski River, which is alternatively known as the Onion River.

History

Pre-Columbian
About 5000 years ago, a single family of paleolithic Native Americans came to what is now the city. The prehistoric campground for this transient group is one of Vermont's significant archaeological sites. Other native people came to Winooski in the years that followed.

Colonial
Situated on a main road, Winooski most likely started as a rest stop for travelers. With a set of waterfalls to assist the growth of industry, however, it soon also became a center for wool processing.

In the early 1770s, Ira Allen constructed a blockhouse on the Winooski (then "Onion") River, which served both as a fort and as general store and office for the land-speculating Onion River Company. Fort Frederick was never used for defense, but its presence increased the value of Onion River property and promoted settlement.

Post-colonial

After the Revolutionary War, Ira Allen built a dam across the river with a sawmill at each end.

In the late 1830s, the Burlington Mill Company used the river's power for the manufacture of yarns and cloth.

In 1846, James and Lucinda Stone from Winooski settled in Sheboygan County in the Wisconsin Territory and named their new settlement Winooski, Wisconsin.

Modern times

The American Woolen Company purchased the failing Burlington Mills in 1901, restoring a measure of economic growth to the area. This success eventually led Winooski to incorporate as a city in 1922, breaking away from the town of Colchester.

The mills closed in 1954, resulting in two decades of economic problems for the city. In the 1980s, two old mills were converted into commercial, office, and apartment space, helping to revitalize the area.

In 1979, the city researched the construction of a dome over the entire city of Winooski, to reduce heating costs during the winter. The proposed dome would have been  at the center, and internal combustion engines would have been banned. Though the dome was never built, to this day, the city's planner defends the concept, insisting, "Economically, it's a slam dunk," and adding, "You could have had year-round fly-fishing."

In 2008, the city dismissed their city manager of 11 months, while he was still an at-will employee. His contract had been scheduled for three years.

Government
The mayor of the city is Kristine Lott, who is the first elected female mayor in Winooski's history.

Demographics

As of the 2010 U.S. census, 7,267 people and 3,252 households were residing in the city.  The population density was 5,191 people per square mile (1,964.1/km2).  The 3,393 housing units had an average density of 2,107.5 per square mile (814.1/km2).  The racial makeup of the city was 82.5% White (81.5% non-Hispanic White alone), 6.9% African American, 0.3% Native American, 6.2% Asian, 0.58% from other races, and 3.3% from two or more races. Hispanics or Latinos of any race were 2.2% of the population. About 36% of the population are of French and French-Canadian ancestry, 13% are Irish, 8% are English, and 5% each are Italian or German.

Of the 3,252 households, 24.2% had children under 18 living with them, 34.4% were couples living together and either married or in a civil union, 11.2% had a female householder with no husband present, and 50.2% were not families. About 36.8% of all households were made up of individuals, and 12.2% had someone living alone who was 65 older.  The average household size was 2.21, and the average family size was 2.98; 14.4% of the city's total population was born outside of the United States.

In the city, the age distribution was 21.5% under 18, 12.3% from 18 to 24, 34.8% from 25 to 44, 17.8% from 45 to 64, and 13.5% who were 65 or older.  The median age was 33 years. For every 100 females, there were 94.5 males.  For every 100 females 18 and over, there were 91.4 males.

Economy

Personal income
The median income for a household in the city was $30,592, and for a family was $38,551. Males had a median income of $30,257 versus $21,168 for females. The per capita income for the city was $17,208.  About 10.2% of families and 15.2% of the population were below the poverty line, including 19.8% of those under age 18 and 13.1% of those age 65 or over.

Transportation
Bus service is provided by Green Mountain Transit.

The city is served by Interstate 89, and US Routes 2 and 7.

Notable people

 Jan Backus, a former Vermont state senator, lives in Winooski.
 Peter Clavelle, former mayor of Burlington, was born in Winooski.

References

External links
 Official city website

 
Cities in Vermont
Burlington, Vermont metropolitan area
Cities in Chittenden County, Vermont